Kalchas is town and union council of Dera Bugti District in the Balochistan province of Pakistan. In 2004 the government of Pakistan granted licences to oil and gas companies for exploration of the resources in this area.

References

Populated places in Dera Bugti District
Union councils of Balochistan, Pakistan